Everybody Loves a Happy Ending is the sixth studio album by English pop rock band Tears for Fears, released on 14 September 2004 in the United States and on 7 March 2005 in the United Kingdom and Europe. 

The album marked Tears for Fears' comeback following a hiatus in the late 1990s, as well as the return of founding member Curt Smith. However, it performed modestly on the UK and US music charts compared to the band's previous records. Work on a follow-up album began in the early 2010s and was not completed until 2022, nearly eighteen years after Everybody Loves a Happy Ending.

Release

Work on the album began in 2000, after Orzabal and Smith ended their longstanding feud. The album was originally due for release in 2003 on the Arista label, but personnel changes in the label's management (namely the departure of L.A. Reid who had signed the duo) led to the band breaking ties with the label before any music was commercially released, with the record company only pressing up a number of red vinyl promos. As Orzabal and Smith own the copyright, they left Arista without having to re-record the album and struck up a number of deals to release the record with various independent/heritage record labels around the world. The album eventually surfaced in the US in 2004 when it was released on the New Door label (a subsidiary of Universal Music), and in the UK in 2005 on the British independent label Gut Records. In 2020, after Orzabal and Smith signed with Irving and Jeff Azoff's Full Stop management company the record appeared on various streaming services worldwide.

According to SoundScan figures, the album had sold 99,000 copies in the US by January 2008.

Reception
At Metacritic, which assigns a normalised rating out of 100 to reviews from mainstream critics, Everybody Loves a Happy Ending has an average score of 65 based on 12 reviews, indicating "generally favorable reviews."

Track listing

Notes
"Size of Sorrow" was written by Roland Orzabal in the 1990s and was first performed live during Tears For Fears' Elemental Tour in 1993, as one of several new and unreleased songs at that time. This earlier version featured slightly different lyrics and the lead vocal was performed by vocalist/bass player Gail Ann Dorsey who was working and touring with the band at the time after the departure of Curt Smith. The studio version, as heard on this album, was sung by Smith.
"Who You Are" is the first original song released by Tears For Fears to not credit Orzabal as a writer. A different version of the song appears on Curt Smith's solo album Halfway, Pleased, released in 2007.
"Ladybird" quotes the English nursery rhyme "Ladybird Ladybird" in its chorus. It was the first collaboration between Smith and Orzabal since the split. Smith had presented the chorus to Orzabal, who wrote a verse to it. The first song written entirely together for the album was "Closest Thing to Heaven".

Personnel

Tears for Fears 
 Roland Orzabal – lead vocals, keyboards, guitars 
 Curt Smith – keyboards, bass, backing vocals, lead vocals (4, 7)

Additional musicians 
 Charlton Pettus – keyboards, guitars
 Kenny Siegal – guitars (4), backing vocals (5)
 Fred Eltringham – drums (1, 3-12)
 Brian Geltner – drums (4)
 Joel Peskin – baritone saxophone (9), tenor saxophone (9)
 Steve Kujala – flute (9)
 Rick Baptist – trumpet (1)
 Gary Grant – trumpet, flugelhorn (9)
 David Washburn – trumpet, flugelhorn (9)
 Alexander Giglio – backing vocals (5)
 Gwen Snyder – backing vocals (5)
 Laura Gray – crowd vocals (5)
 Julian Orzabal – crowd vocals (5)

Orchestra on "Secret World"
 Paul Buckmaster – arrangements and conductor
 Suzie Katayama – contractor 
 Stefanie Fife, Barry Gold, Maurice Grants, Vahe Hayrikyan, Suzie Katayama, Miguel Martinez, Dan Smith and Rudy Stein – cello 
 Gayle Levant – harp
 Bob Becker, Denyse Buffman, Roland Kato, Carole Mukogawa, Karie Prescott and Evan Wilson – viola
 Charlie Bisharat, Eve Butler, Mario DeLeon, Joel Derouin, Julian Hallmark, Armen Garabedian, Berj Garabedian, Norm Hughes, Peter Kent, Michael Markman, Robert Matsuda, Sid Page, Sandra Park, Sara Parkins, Bob Peterson, Lesa Terry, Josefina Veraga and John Wittenberg – violin

Production 
 Tears for Fears – producers
 Charlton Pettus – producer, recording, drum recording (12)
 Neil Dorfsman – drum recording (1, 2, 3, 5-11)
 Tom Schick – drum recording (4), additional guitar recording (4)
 Miles Wilson – drum recording assistant 
 Mark O'Donoughue – additional engineer 
 Steve Churchyard – orchestra session recording (9)
 Tim Palmer – mixing at Larrabee North (North Hollywood, California)
 Andy Gwynn – mix assistant 
 Pete Novak – mix assistant
 Stephen Marcussen – mastering at Marcussen Mastering (Hollywood, California, USA)
 Jayce Murphy – Nuendo programming
 Michael Kachko – product manager 
 Cindi Peters – project coordinator
 Ute Friesleben – production manager
 Alan Aldridge – illustrations, logo design
 Ryan Rogers – additional design 
 Zoren Gold – photography 
 The Firm – management

Charts

References

2004 albums
Albums with cover art by Alan Aldridge
Tears for Fears albums